Pauline Camille Peyraud-Magnin (born 17 March 1992) is a French professional footballer who plays as a goalkeeper for Italian Serie A club Juventus and the France national team.

Club career
Peyraud-Magnin had two spells with Lyon in the D1 Féminine, the top division of football in France, in between that she had spells with Issy, St-Étienne and Marseille. After three league titles with Lyon, English club Arsenal signed the player for an undisclosed fee and contract length in July 2018. Her first appearance for them was on the opening day of the season, keeping a clean sheet in a 5–0 win over Liverpool on 9 September.Then she was chosen for the French national team.

On 2 July 2021, Pauline joined Juventus.

Personal life
She came out as lesbian in October 2020.

Career statistics

Honours
Juventus
 Serie A: 2021–22
 Coppa Italia: 
 Supercoppa Italiana: 2021–22

References

External links
 
 

1992 births
Living people
French women's footballers
France women's youth international footballers
Women's Super League players
Arsenal W.F.C. players
FA Women's National League players
Olympique de Marseille (women) players
Women's association football goalkeepers
Olympique Lyonnais Féminin players
AS Saint-Étienne (women) players
Expatriate women's footballers in England
French expatriate sportspeople in England
Division 1 Féminine players
Atlético Madrid Femenino players
Primera División (women) players
Juventus F.C. (women) players
Serie A (women's football) players
Expatriate women's footballers in Italy
French expatriate sportspeople in Italy
2019 FIFA Women's World Cup players
France women's international footballers
French LGBT sportspeople
LGBT association football players
Lesbian sportswomen
GPSO 92 Issy players
UEFA Women's Euro 2022 players
French expatriate women's footballers